Ballyhooly is a small village in north County Cork situated along the N72 between Castletownroche and Fermoy.
Ballyhooly is home to two pubs, a church, community centre and petrol station with shop. During the Celtic tiger, several housing estates were attached to the village. Ballyhooly is part of the Cork East Dáil constituency.

History
Castle Ballyhooly, a 17th-century manor house outside of the town, was the site of a well-known skirmish during the Irish Civil War, known as the "Ballyhooly Massacre", despite the fact that only one person was killed. Ballyhooly is also the subject of the novel The Ghost of Ballyhooly by Betty Cavanna, which relates the story of a local girl who disappeared from the castle in the 1890s and was never found. Other books include The Ford of the Apples, which tells the story of the village.

References

Towns and villages in County Cork
Civil parishes of County Cork